Program music is a term applied to any musical composition on the classical music tradition in which the piece is designed according to some preconceived narrative, or is designed to evoke a specific idea and atmosphere. This is distinct from the more traditional absolute music popular in the Baroque and Classical eras, in which the piece has no narrative program or ideas and is simply created for music's sake. Musical forms such as the symphonic poem, ballade, suite, overture and some compositions in freer forms are named as program music since they intended to bring out extra-musical elements like sights and incidents.

Opera, ballet, and Lieder could also trivially be considered program music since they are intended to accompany vocal or stage performances.  They will be excluded from this list except where they have been extensively popularized and played without the original vocals and/or stage performance.

The orchestral program music tradition is also continued in some pieces for jazz orchestra.  For narrative or evocative popular music, please see Concept Album.

Any discussion of program music brings to mind Walt Disney's animated features Fantasia (1940) and Fantasia 2000 (1999), in which the Disney animators provided explicit visualizations of a number of famous pieces of program music. However, not all the pieces used in the films were particularly programmatic, and in most cases the narratives illustrated by the animators were different from whatever programmatic narrative might have existed originally.

List of program music by composer

Edmund Angerer 

 Toy Symphony

Johann Sebastian Bach 

 Capriccio for keyboard in B♭ "On the departure of a beloved brother" BWV 992
 St Matthew Passion BWV 244
 Many of Bach's cantatas contain elements that could be considered programmatic

P. D. Q. Bach 

 1712 Overture

Les Baxter 

 Ritual of the Savage (1951)
 The Passions: featuring Bas Sheva (1954)

Ludwig van Beethoven 

 Coriolan Overture, Op. 62 (1807); based on the story of Coriolanus
 Symphony No. 6, Pastoral, Op. 68 (1808); features titled movements, country dances, bird calls, and a storm.
 Leonore No. 3 Overture, Op. 72b (1806); one of a series of overtures composed for the opera Leonore, later renamed Fidelio.  Leonore No. 3 is well known for portraying some of the major events of the plot in a condensed, purely orchestral form, most notably the distant trumpet fanfares of the finale.  Next to the actual, finalized Fidelio overture, this is the most commonly performed version, and still sometimes replaces the Fidelio overture in some productions.
 Egmont Overture, Op. 84
 Wellington's Victory, Op. 91 is also known as the Battle Symphony and describes the battle between the French and British armies outside the Spanish town of Vitoria and the subsequent British victory. The work features rifles and cannons as instruments. It also makes use of Rule Britannia, which is used to describe the British, whereas the French side is announced by the French song Marlbrouk s'en va-t-en guerre.
 Piano Sonata in A flat Op. 26 (3rd movement subtitled "Death of a hero", 4th movement manifestly "Life goes on" in intent)
 Piano Sonata in D minor Op. 31 Nr. 2 ("Der Sturm", inspired by Shakespeare's The Tempest)

Hector Berlioz 

 Symphonie Fantastique, (1830)
 Harold in Italy, based on Childe Harold's Pilgrimage by Lord Byron, (1834)
 Romeo et Juliette, symphonie dramatique

Benjamin Britten 

 Four Sea Interludes, (1945) — Britten extracted four of the six interludes from his opera Peter Grimes for performance as a stand-alone orchestral piece. "I. Dawn," "II. Sunday Morning" (describing a seaside community gathering to worship),  "III. Moonlight," and "IV. Storm" were all meant to literally describe these scenes and images through Britten's music.

Anton Bruckner 

 Symphony No. 4 in E-flat major, "Romantic" — The program, involving medieval castles and dawn and royal hunts, appears to have been an afterthought like it was with the other Symphonies, but the validity of it in this case is supported by the subtitle given to the work, the only one of Bruckner's Symphonies to have been given a subtitle by the composer himself.

Michael Colgrass

 Winds of Nagual

Aaron Copland

 Appalachian Spring
 Billy the Kid
 Lincoln Portrait
 Rodeo

Claude Debussy

Debussy wrote more or less entirely in the 'program' style; see List of compositions by Claude Debussy

Paul Dukas

 The Sorcerer's Apprentice

Antonín Dvořák

 Symphony No. 9, From the New World, which is associated with The Song of Hiawatha and describes the composer's impressions of America.
 The Water Goblin
 The Noon Witch
 A Hero's Song
 Four Overtures:
 Hussite Overture
In Nature's Realm
Carnival
Othello

Edward Elgar

Many of Elgar's works are associated with favourite places, mostly in Herefordshire and Worcestershire where he lived, and his MSS are often noted as such
 
 Variations on an Original Theme (Enigma), Op. 36, a series of musical portraits of the composer's friends (and in one case their dog as well), and incidents associated with them. In addition a secret underlying "Enigma" theme runs through the whole work, which has never been definitely discovered
 Sea Pictures
 Overture Cockaigne (In London Town), Op. 40
 The Wand of Youth, Opp. 1a and 1b, two suites based on music he had written as a child
 Overture In the South (Alassio), Op. 50
 Falstaff, symphonic study, Op. 68
 The Severn Suite, Op. 85, for brass band
 Nursery Suite

Duke Ellington
 Harlem Air Shaft

George Gershwin 

 An American in Paris, (1928) Taxi horns, a solicitation by a prostitute, homesickness lifting on meeting with a fellow American

Alexander Glazunov

Alexander Konstantinovich Glazunov was a prolific composer of symphonic poems, independent overtures and fantasias, who often drew his inspiration from history.

 To the Memory of a Hero, elegy for orchestra, Op. 8
 Stenka Razin, Op. 13
 The Forest, fantasy for orchestra, Op. 19
 Slavonian Feast, symphonic sketches, Op. 26A
 The Sea, fantasy for orchestra, Op. 28
 Oriental Rhapsody, Op. 29
 The Kremlin, symphonic picture in three parts, Op. 30
 The Spring, symphonic picture, Op. 34
 Carnaval, overture for large orchestra and organ, Op. 45
 From Dark into Light, fantasy for orchestra, Op. 53
 Solemn Overture, Op. 73
 From the Middle Ages, suite for orchestra, Op. 79
 The Song of Destiny, dramatic overture, Op. 84
 Russian Fantasy for balalaika-orchestra, Op. 86
 To the Memory of Gogol, symphonic prologue, Op. 87
 Finnish Fantasy for orchestra, Op. 88
 Finnish Sketches for orchestra, Op. 89
 Karelian Legend, Op. 99
 Poème épique, Op. posth.

Edvard Grieg 

 Peer Gynt, originally a selection from incidental music and a song for the play Peer Gynt by Henrik Ibsen, but now is almost always played by itself.
 Lyric Pieces
 Wedding Day at Troldhaugen

Ferde Grofé 
 Grand Canyon Suite, (1931). Named sections illustrate "Sunrise," "The Painted Desert," "On the Trail," "Sunset" and "Cloudburst." "On the Trail" is the familiar section with a mule's braying and hoofbeats. "Cloudburst," another musical storm, was described by Toscanini as "vivid and terrifying."

Robin Holloway 

 Domination of Black op.23, for orchestra after a poem of Wallace Stevens
 Europa & the Bull op.121, for solo tuba and orchestra after Ovid 
 Phaeton's Journey: Son of the Sun op.131, for solo trumpet and orchestra after Ovid

Alan Hovhaness 

 Storm on Mount Wildcat
 Sosi – Forest of Prophetic Sounds
 Vision from High Rock
 Mysterious Mountain (Symphony No.2)
 Macedonian Mountain Dance
 Fantasy on Japanese Wood Prints
 And God Created Great Whales (orchestra with humpbacked whale songs)
 Vishnu Symphony (Symphony No.19)
 Majnun Symphony (Symphony No.24)
 Odysseus Symphony (Symphony No.25)
 Mount St. Helens Symphony (Symphony No.50)

Augusta Holmès 

 Irlande
 Pologne

Charles Ives 

 The Celestial Railroad
 Central Park in the Dark
 String Quartet No. 2 ("Discussions", "Arguments", and "The Call of the Mountains")
 A Symphony: New England Holidays
 Three Places in New England
 The Unanswered Question
 Yale-Princeton Football Game

Leoš Janáček 

 Taras Bulba, rhapsody for orchestra based on the novella by Nikolai Gogol

Albert Ketèlbey 

Most of the better-known compositions of Ketèlbey are strongly programmatic, including:
 In a Monastery Garden
 In a Persian Market
 In the Mystic Land of Egypt
 Bells across the Meadows
 With Honour Crowned

Franz Liszt 

Liszt is considered the inventor of the symphonic poem and his programmatic orchestral works set the framework for several composers of the romantic era. He composed a total of thirteen symphonic poems as well as two programmatic symphonies, drawing his inspiration from a variety of literary, mythological, historical and artistic sources.

 Ce qu'on entend sur la montagne (What is heard on the mountain), after a poem by Victor Hugo
 Tasso, Lamento e Trionfo, based on stories by Byron  and Goethe on the life of the poet Torquato Tasso
 Les Préludes, based on Lamartine
 Orpheus
 Prometheus
 Mazeppa, based on Hugo and Byron
 Festklänge (Festival Sounds)
 Héroïde funèbre
 From the Cradle to the Grave
 Hungaria
 Hamlet, based on the play by Shakespeare
 Hunnenschlacht (Battle of the Huns), based on a monumental fresco by painter Wilhelm von Kaulbach depicting the battle between Emperor Theoderic and Attila the Hun in 451
 Die Ideale based on a work by Friedrich von Schiller
 Faust Symphony, after the epic work by Goethe
 Dante Symphony, after Dante's Divine Comedy

Frederik Magle 

 The Hope (2001), depicting the battle of Copenhagen

Gustav Mahler 

Much of Mahler's early work was designed programmatically.  However, he made serious efforts to downplay the programmatic reputation of many of these pieces later in his life, including removing some of the programmatic titles from his symphonies.
 Symphony No. 1, Titan, (1888)
 Symphony No. 2, Resurrection, (1894)
 Symphony No. 3,  (1896)
 Das Lied von der Erde

Olivier Messiaen 

 La Nativite du Seigneur (The Nativity of Our Lord), strongly programmatic series of organ pieces
 Des Canyons au Etoiles ("From the Canyons to the Stars"), on the natural beauty of the United States
 Catalogue d'oiseaux ("Catalog of Birds")
 Oiseaux exotiques

Modest Mussorgsky 

 Pictures at an Exhibition; movements represent a series of paintings and the promenade of a viewer around the gallery
 Night on Bald Mountain

Carl Nielsen 

 Helios Overture, Op. 17

Maurice Ravel 

 Daphnis et Chloé
 La Valse
 Jeux d'eau
 Miroirs suite
 Gaspard de la nuit
 Ma mère l'oye
 Pavane pour une infante défunte

Ottorino Respighi 

 I pini di Roma ("The Pines of Rome"), 1923–1924
 Vetrate di Chiesa ("Church Windows"), 1926
 Gli Uccelli ("The Birds"), 1927
 Le fontane di Roma ("The Fountains of Rome"), 1915–1916
 Feste Romane ("Roman Festivals"), 1928

Terry Riley 
 Chanting the Light of Foresight, with Rova Saxophone Quartet

Nikolai Rimsky-Korsakov 

 Scheherazade, Op. 35, (1888). Symphonic suite after the “Thousand and One Nights”. Section titles such as "The Sea and Sinbad's Ship," "Festival in Baghdad."
 Antar - symphony No. 2, later published as a symphonic suite.
 Sadko, Op. 5 - described as a Musical Picture
 Night on Mt Triglav - extracted from the opera “Mlada”
 Skazka - “Fairy Tale” inspired by Pushkin.
 The Snow Maiden - suite from the opera “Snegurochka”
 Christmas Eve - suite from the opera
 The Invisible City of Kitezh - suite from the opera
 The Golden Cockerel - suite from the opera
Plus many other works inspired by myths and fairy tales

Gioachino Rossini 
 William Tell Overture

Camille Saint-Saëns 

 Phaéton, Op. 39
 Danse Macabre, Op. 40 (1874)
 The Carnival of the Animals, (1886)

Arnold Schoenberg 

 Verklärte Nacht, Op. 4 ("Transfigured Night"), 1899  Romantic musical portrait of a moonlight forest walk, from Richard Dehmel's poem

Peter Seabourne 

 Symphony of Roses, for orchestra after poems by W.B. Yeats and a painting by Jack Yeats
 Tu Sospiri?, for orchestra related to Nancy Storace and Mozart
 The Darkness of Ages, tone poem for orchestra inspired by a description of a well by Leos Janacek
 My River, septet based on a poem of Emily Dickinson

Jean Sibelius 

Sibelius composed several tone poems throughout his career, often making use of stories and motifs from the Finnish national epic, the Kalevala. Early in his career he also wrote works on national and historical subjects.

 Finlandia
 Kullervo, Op. 7, symphonic poem based on the story of Kullervo in Finnish mythology
 En saga, Op. 9
 Karelia Suite, Op. 11
 Lemminkäinen Legends, Op. 22, four symphonic poems based on the story of Lemminkäinen in the Kalevala
 The Dryad, Op. 45 No. 1
 Pohjola's Daughter, Op. 49, tone poem based on a story from the Kalevala
 Nightride and Sunrise, Op. 55
 The Bard, Op. 64
 Luonnotar, Op. 70
 The Oceanides, Op.73
 Tapiola, Op. 112

Bedřich Smetana 

 Má vlast, 1874–1879
 String Quartet No. 1, From my life

William Grant Still 

 Symphony No. 1 "Afro-American"
 Symphony No. 2 in G minor, "Song of a New Race"

Richard Strauss 

A major developer of the tone poem as a musical form, Strauss displayed outstanding skill at musical description. He claimed that he was capable of "describing a knife and fork" in music, and said that a sensitive listener to Don Juan could discern the hair color of Don Juan's amorous partners.

 Don Juan, Op. 20 (1889)
 Macbeth, Op. 23
 Tod und Verklärung ("Death and Transfiguration") Op. 24 (1889)
 Till Eulenspiegels lustige Streiche ("Till Eulenspiegel's merry pranks"), Op. 28
 Also Sprach Zarathustra ("Thus Spoke Zarathustra"), Op. 30 (1896)
 Don Quixote, Op. 35 (1897)
 Ein Heldenleben ("A hero's life"), Op. 40
 Symphonia Domestica ("Domestic Symphony"), Op. 53 (1903).  A musical description of the composer's personal daily life, including an unflattering musical picture of Frau Strauss
 Eine Alpensinfonie ("An Alpine Symphony"), Op. 64 (1915). A work with twenty-two named narrative sections describing the ascent of an alpine mountain. A section of the work depicts a thunderstorm, with perhaps the most realistic thunder-and-lightning in orchestral music.
 Duett-Concertino (1947), depicting a princess and a bear.

Pyotr Ilyich Tchaikovsky 

 Romeo and Juliet Fantasy Overture (1869; revised 1870, 1880)
 The Tempest Symphonic Fantasia after Shakespeare, Op. 18 (1873)
 Hamlet Overture-Fantasia, Op. 67a (1888)
The above three works are based on plays by Shakespeare
 Francesca da Rimini, Op. 32 (1876) is based on Dante's Inferno.
 Manfred Symphony in four scenes after the dramatic poem by Byron, Op. 58
 The 1812 Overture (1882) famously uses different themes to represent the French and Russian armies in the Napoleonic Wars, and concludes with the firing of cannons and the ringing of the church bells.

Nobuo Uematsu 
 Final Fantasy Many different themes over the video game series representing different characters and situations

Richard Wagner 

 Siegfried Idyll

Ralph Vaughan Williams 

 The Lark Ascending
 Sinfonia Antartica About the explorer Captain Scott's doomed expedition to the south pole, arranged from his film score

See also
List of symphonic poems

References

Program music